Ivan Kušek-Apaš City Stadium is a football stadium in Koprivnica, Croatia. It serves as home ground for NK Slaven Belupo football club. The stadium has a capacity of 3,134 seats. In May 2007, city of Koprivnica (which is the owner) had finished putting up floodlights, so that domestic league and UEFA Europa League games could be played at night.

Plans
There are plans for building luxury suites for journalists and VIP`s on the western grandstand as well as building a permanent roof on the grandstand because the one that is here now is only temporary.

International matches

References

Football venues in Croatia
NK Slaven Belupo
Sport in Koprivnica
Buildings and structures in Koprivnica-Križevci County